Dennis Schröder (born September 15, 1993) is a German professional basketball player for the Los Angeles Lakers of the National Basketball Association (NBA). He previously played for SG Braunschweig and Phantoms Braunschweig in Germany, before spending his first five seasons in the NBA with the Atlanta Hawks and two years with the Oklahoma City Thunder. He is the sole owner of his German hometown team, Braunschweig of the Easycredit BBL, and has been the majority shareholder of the team since 2018.

Professional career

Phantoms Braunschweig (2010–2013)
Schröder started playing professional basketball in 2010 for SG Braunschweig, farm team of Phantoms Braunschweig. In his first season with SUM Baskets Braunschweig, he averaged 7.8 points, 2.1 assists and 1.6 rebounds per game in a 2nd-tier German League. In the 2011–12 season he made a breakthrough, averaging 17.8 points and 6.7 assists over 23 regular season games. His team went in the playoffs where he averaged 18.8 points and 5.1 assists over 4 games. In the same season, he also played 30 games for Phantoms Braunschweig of the German League, averaging 2.3 points, 0.7 assists and 0.8 rebounds in about 8 minutes per game.

In the 2012–13 season he played 32 games for Phantoms Braunschweig, averaging 12 points, 3.2 assists and 2.5 rebounds in 25 minutes per game. For the season, he was named the League's Most Improved Player as well as Best Young German Player.

In 2013, Schröder was announced to play at the 2013 Nike Hoop Summit for the World Select Team. Before officially playing at the Nike Hoop Summit, Schröder decided to declare for the 2013 NBA draft. On April 20, 2013, Schröder led his team to a 112–98 win. He finished with 18 points, 6 assists and 2 rebounds in 29 minutes.

Atlanta Hawks (2013–2018)

On June 27, 2013, Schröder was selected by the Atlanta Hawks with the 17th overall pick in the 2013 NBA draft. On July 11, 2013, he signed with the Hawks. He was compared to Rajon Rondo for his playing style and large hands. He entered the season as the Hawks' second point guard, just behind Jeff Teague in the rotation. Schröder was guilty of frequent turnovers early in the season, and as a result, his minutes were cut accordingly, with Shelvin Mack taking over the second-string point guard. He spent time in the NBA Development League in December, with the Bakersfield Jam, and finished his rookie season playing in just 49 games for the Hawks, with 3.7 points in 13.1 minutes per game.

On December 22, 2014, Schröder scored a career-high 22 points in a 105–102 win over the Dallas Mavericks. Schröder participated in the Rising Stars Challenge on February 13, 2015, recording 13 points, a game-high nine assists and three steals in Team World's 121–112 win over Team USA. His performance was lauded by ESPN analysts as looking like a "young Tony Parker". On March 15, 2015, he had 24 points and 10 assists in a 91–86 win over the Los Angeles Lakers. Schröder had a "breakout year" in 2014–15, increasing his averages to 10.0 points and 4.1 assists in 19.7 minutes per game, appearing in 77 regular season games with 10 starts.

Schröder continued to play behind All-Star Teague in 2015–16, making just six starts in 80 games. He averaged 11.0 points and 4.4 assists in 20.3 minutes per game, shooting 42% from the field and 32% from 3-point range, leading to defenders often daring him to shoot the three. On February 20, 2016, he recorded 25 points and 10 assists in a 117–109 overtime loss to the Milwaukee Bucks. In Game 1 of the Hawks' second round playoff series against the Cleveland Cavaliers, Schröder scored a playoff career-high 27 points in a 104–93 loss.

On October 26, 2016, Schröder signed a four-year, $70 million contract extension with the Hawks. He took the reins as the Hawks' lead guard in 2016–17 following Teague's trade to the Indiana Pacers. On November 8, 2016, Schröder scored a then career-high 28 points in a 110–106 win over the Cleveland Cavaliers. On November 30, 2016, he scored 14 of his career-high 31 points in the fourth quarter of the Hawks' 109–107 loss to the Phoenix Suns. On December 9, 2016, he set a new career high with 33 points in a 114–110 win over the Milwaukee Bucks. In Game 5 of the Hawks' first round playoff series against the Washington Wizards, Schröder led the Hawks with 29 points, making a career high-tying five 3s, and 11 assists in a 103–99 loss.

On December 23, 2017, Schröder matched his career high with 33 points, including 27 in the second half, to help the Hawks beat the Dallas Mavericks 112–107. On January 12, 2018, he scored a career-high 34 points in a 110–105 loss to the Brooklyn Nets. On March 20, 2018, he set a new career high with 41 points in a 99–94 win over the Utah Jazz.

Oklahoma City Thunder (2018–2020)
On July 25, 2018, Schröder was traded to the Oklahoma City Thunder in a three-team deal involving the Hawks and the Philadelphia 76ers. In his first season in Oklahoma, he was positioned as the team's sixth man, coming off the bench behind superstar point guard Russell Westbrook. In his debut for the Thunder in their season opener on October 16, Schröder recorded 21 points, eight rebounds, six assists and three steals in a 108–100 loss to the Golden State Warriors. On November 7, he scored a then season-high 28 points in a 95–86 win over the Cleveland Cavaliers. On November 21, he scored a season-high 32 points off the bench in a 123–95 win over the Warriors. On February 1, 2019, he scored 24 of his 28 points in the second quarter of the Thunder's 118–102 win over the Miami Heat. On March 3, he recorded 17 points and a career-high 11 rebounds in a 99–95 win over the Memphis Grizzlies. His second season with the team saw him in the role of the sixth man yet again, this time behind veteran All-Star point guard Chris Paul and Shai Gilgeous-Alexander. Schröder led the league in scoring off the bench with 18.9 points per game, while shooting a career-high 46.9% from the field, including 38.5% on 3-point field goals. He finished as the runner-up to Montrezl Harrell in voting for the NBA Sixth Man of the Year.

Los Angeles Lakers (2020–2021)
On November 18, 2020, Schröder was traded to the Los Angeles Lakers in exchange for Danny Green and the draft rights to first-round pick Jaden McDaniels. On December 22, 2020, Schröder made his Lakers debut, putting up 14 points, 12 rebounds, and eight assists, in a 116–109 loss to the Los Angeles Clippers. At the end of March 2021, he rejected the Lakers' contract extension offer of four-years, $84 million to pursue a larger deal in the off-season as an unrestricted free agent. He was sidelined twice during the season due to the league's COVID-19 health protocols, including missing seven games late in the season. Schröder started 61 games during the regular season, averaging 15.4 points and 5.8 assists per games and shooting 43.7% shooting from the field and 33.5% on 3-pointers. His numbers dropped in the playoffs to 14.3 points and 2.8 assists while shooting 40.3% from the field and 31.9% from three-point range, and the Lakers were eliminated in six games by Phoenix. During the off-season, the Lakers traded for point guard Russell Westbrook, signaling that the Lakers would inevitably be moving on from Schröder.

Boston Celtics (2021–2022)
On August 13, 2021, Schröder signed with the Boston Celtics, on a one-year, $5.9 million taxpayer mid-level exception contract. The Celtics, who had recently moved on from starting point guard Kemba Walker via trade earlier in the off-season, were in search of backcourt depth and Schröder fit the bill at a much discounted price than his original extension talks with the Lakers during the 2020–21 season.  
Schröder chose to wear number 71 with the Celtics as his usual number 17 had been retired by the Celtics in honor of John Havlicek. He became only the fourth known player in the history of the league to wear the number 71 and the first since McCoy McLemore in 1965.

Houston Rockets (2022)
On February 10, 2022, Schröder was traded, along with Enes Freedom and Bruno Fernando, to the Houston Rockets in exchange for Daniel Theis. On March 29, Schröder was ruled out for the remainder of the season with a shoulder injury.

Return to the Lakers (2022–present)
On September 16, 2022, the Los Angeles Lakers signed Schröder to a one-year deal. Schröder chose the Lakers over the Toronto Raptors and Phoenix Suns. 

On January 4, 2023, Schröder scored 14 of his season-high 32 points in the fourth quarter to lead the Lakers to a 112–109 win over the Miami Heat. On January 20, Schröder put up 19 points, eight rebounds, eight assists, and made a game-winning layup in a 122–121 win over the Memphis Grizzlies.

National team career

Schröder has been a member of the German national under-18 and German national under-20 teams. He played in the 2012 FIBA Europe Under-20 Championship and helped the German team to fifth place, averaging 6.1 points, 2 assists and 1.8 rebounds in 14.6 minutes on the court. On July 27, 2014, he made his debut for the senior Germany national basketball team in a game against Finland.

Schröder played at EuroBasket 2015, in the group stage that was hosted in Berlin. Germany did not qualify for the knock-out stage and finished on the 18th place in the final rankings.

He returned for EuroBasket 2017, leading Germany to the quarterfinals and averaging a team-high 23.7 points and 5.6 assists per game.

Schröder had expressed a desire to play for Germany at the 2020 Summer Olympics, however, the German Basketball Federation was unable to meet the financial insurance requirements.

He returned to EuroBasket 2022 and led Germany to third place, being named to the EuroBasket All-Tournament Team in the process. The run included a famous win over Greece in the quarterfinals, which had Giannis Antetokounmpo on the roster. Schröder averaged team-highs 22.1 points and 7.1 assists per game.

Career statistics

NBA

Regular season

|-
| style="text-align:left;"| 
| style="text-align:left;"| Atlanta
| 49 || 0 || 13.1 || .383 || .238 || .674 || 1.2 || 1.9 || .3 || .0 || 3.7
|-
| style="text-align:left;"| 
| style="text-align:left;"| Atlanta
| 77 || 10 || 19.7 || .427 || .351 || .827 || 2.1 || 4.1 || .6 || .1 || 10.0
|-
| style="text-align:left;"| 
| style="text-align:left;"| Atlanta
| 80 || 6 || 20.3 || .421 || .322 || .791 || 2.6 || 6.3 || .9 || .1 || 11.0
|-
| style="text-align:left;"| 
| style="text-align:left;"| Atlanta
| 79 || 78 || 31.5 || .451 || .340 || .855 || 3.1 || 6.3 || .8 || .2 || 17.9
|-
| style="text-align:left;"| 
| style="text-align:left;"| Atlanta
| 67 || 67 || 31.0 || .436 || .290 || .849 || 3.1 || 6.2 || 1.1 || .1 || 19.4
|-
| style="text-align:left;"| 
| style="text-align:left;"| Oklahoma City
| 79 || 14 || 29.3 || .414 || .341 || .819 || 3.6 || 4.1 || .8 || .2 || 15.5
|-
| style="text-align:left;"| 
| style="text-align:left;"| Oklahoma City
| 65 || 2 || 30.8 || .469 ||  .385  || .839 || 3.6 || 4.0 || .7 || .2 || 18.9
|-
| style="text-align:left;"| 
| style="text-align:left;"| L.A. Lakers
| 61 || 61 || 32.1 || .437 || .335  || .848 || 3.5 || 5.8 || 1.1 || .2 || 15.4
|-
| style="text-align:left;"| 
| style="text-align:left;"| Boston
| 49 || 25 || 29.2 || .440 || .349  || .848 || 3.3 || 4.2 || .8 || .1 || 14.4
|-
| style="text-align:left;"| 
| style="text-align:left;"| Houston
| 15 || 4 || 26.9 || .393 || .328  || .872 || 3.3 || 5.9 || .8 || .2 || 10.9
|- class="sortbottom"
| style="text-align:center;" colspan="2"| Career
| 621 || 267 || 26.5 || .436 || .338 || .833 || 2.9 || 4.7 || .8 || .1 || 14.2

Playoffs

|-
| style="text-align:left;"| 2014
| style="text-align:left;"| Atlanta
| 2 || 0 || 3.5 || 1.000 || 1.000 || .000 || 1.0 || .0 || .0 || .0 || 2.5
|-
| style="text-align:left;"| 2015
| style="text-align:left;"| Atlanta
| 16 || 0 || 18.1 || .386 || .235 || .857 || 1.8 || 3.9 || .6 || .0 || 9.0
|-
| style="text-align:left;"| 2016
| style="text-align:left;"| Atlanta
| 10 || 0 || 19.1 || .452 || .343 || .846 || 1.9 || 3.6 || .4 || .1 || 11.7
|-
| style="text-align:left;"| 2017
| style="text-align:left;"| Atlanta
| 6 || 6 || 35.2 || .455 || .425 || .838 || 2.3 || 7.7 || 1.2 || .0 || 24.7
|-
| style="text-align:left;"| 2019
| style="text-align:left;"| Oklahoma City
| 5 || 0 || 30.2 || .455 || .300 || .722 || 3.2 || 3.4 || .8 || .0 || 13.8
|-
| style="text-align:left;"| 2020
| style="text-align:left;"| Oklahoma City
| 7 || 0 || 32.4 || .404 || .289 || .800 || 3.7 || 3.6 || .6 || .1 || 17.3
|-
| style="text-align:left;"| 2021
| style="text-align:left;"|  L.A. Lakers
| 6 || 6 || 32.7 || .400 || .308 || .846 || 3.0 || 2.8 || 1.0 || .2 || 14.3
|- class="sortbottom"
| style="text-align:center;" colspan="2"| Career
| 52 || 12 || 24.5 || .424 || .323 || .823 || 2.4 || 3.9 || .6 || .1 || 13.3

Personal life
Schröder is the son of a German father and a Gambian mother. He stated that he started focusing on his basketball career after his father died in 2009. He and his brother were both heavily involved with skateboarding until Dennis found basketball at age 11. Schröder also has a younger sister. His agent was former German basketball national player Ademola Okulaja.

Schröder became known for his "signature" patch of bleached blonde hair which he adopted upon leaving Germany for the United States.

Schröder is Muslim.

He had two stints at play relief because of COVID-19 protocols, and spoke in May 2021 about not being vaccinated.

References

External links
 

1993 births
Living people
2019 FIBA Basketball World Cup players
Atlanta Hawks draft picks
Atlanta Hawks players
Bakersfield Jam players
Basketball Löwen Braunschweig players
Boston Celtics players
German expatriate basketball people in the United States
German Muslims
German people of Gambian descent
German sportspeople of African descent
Houston Rockets players
Los Angeles Lakers players
National Basketball Association players from Germany
German men's basketball players
Oklahoma City Thunder players
Point guards
Sportspeople from Braunschweig